Justin Mitchell Alexander Cole (born November 22, 1987) is a former American football linebacker. He played college football at San Jose State, where in 49 games he recovered five fumbles and forced another four.

Cole has also been a member of the Kansas City Chiefs, St. Louis Rams, Cleveland Browns, Oakland Raiders and Saskatchewan Roughriders.

Early years
Cole attended Chino Hills High School, where he was credited with 36 tackles and four quarterback sacks and was named his team’s "Most Improved Player" as a senior. He received first-team All-Sierra League and second-team All-Inland Empire honors in 2004.

Regarded as a two-star recruit by Rivals.com, he was not listed among the top prospects of his class.

College career
After redshirting his initial year at San Jose State, Cole recorded 32 tackles, including 9.5 tackles for loss, and 4.0 quarterback sacks in his freshman year. He earned freshman All-America recognition from the Sporting News. Cole added 36 tackles in his sophomore season.

In his junior year, Cole doubled his career tackle total with 68 stops, and also had 5.0 sacks (sixth in the WAC). He came up with his first career interception, a 62-yard interception return for a touchdown and his single game career best of 12 tackles (1 solo, 11 assisted) against Boise State. He earned a Second-team All-WAC selection, which he also received in his senior year. Cole graduated from San Jose State with a B.S. in business management in 2010.

Professional career

St. Louis Rams
After being signed to the Kansas City Chiefs' practice squad on September 4, 2011, he was signed by the St. Louis Rams on November 14.

Cleveland Browns
Cole signed with the Cleveland Browns on July 24, 2013. The Browns cut Cole on August 30.

Oakland Raiders
Cole was signed by the Oakland Raiders during the 2014 offseason, but was released on August 24, 2014.

Saskatchewan Roughriders
Cole was signed to the Saskatchewan Roughriders practice roster on October 8, 2014. Cole was waived on November 6.

Winnipeg Blue Bombers
Cole played in five games for the Winnipeg Blue Bombers in 2015, recording three defensive tackles and two sacks. He played in 11 games for the Blue Bombers in 2016, recording 15 defensive tackles, two special teams tackles, five sacks, one interception and two forced fumbles.

References

External links
Kansas City Chiefs bio
San Jose State Spartans bio

1987 births
Living people
Chino Hills High School alumni
Players of American football from Pasadena, California
Players of Canadian football from Pasadena, California
American football linebackers
San Jose State Spartans football players
Kansas City Chiefs players
St. Louis Rams players
Cleveland Browns players
Oakland Raiders players
Winnipeg Blue Bombers players